Ram Balak Mahto was the longest serving Advocate General of the state of Bihar and chief legal advisor of Nitish Kumar. From 1937 to date only 20 Advocate Generals have been appointed and out of these Mahto was appointed six times, becoming the longest serving Advocate general. He served both Nitish Kumar and Lalu Prasad Yadav led government and was first appointed to the post in the year 1980.

Life and career
He remained on the coveted post during the tenure of six chief ministers of Bihar. He was appointed for the first time under the chief ministry of Bindeshwari Dubey in 1980. Later he also served under the congress's Bhagwat Jha Azad and Satyendra Narayan Sinha.
Mahto served as legal advisor of Lalu Prasad Yadav and secured the candidacy of one of his sons Virendra Kumar for Teghra Vidhan Sabha constituency from Rashtriya Janata Dal. Being successful in elections of 2015, his son joined Janata Dal (United) in 2020. The interregnum in the career of Mahto came when Jitan Ram Manjhi replaced him with D.K Sinha as Advocate General, however Nitish reappointed him once again after taking charge as Chief Minister in 2017. He won many important cases for the Government of Bihar and played important role in controversial cases like that of Mohammad Shahabuddin, the Rashtriya Janata Dal leader accused of infamous acid attack case of Siwan.

He died in October 2020 at the age of 98. He was suffering from heart disease for a long time.

References

External links

20th-century Indian lawyers
2020 deaths
Advocates General for Indian states
People from Bihar